Veerampattinam is the largest coastal village in the union territory of Puducherry situated between Pondicherry and Cuddalore. The village is 7 km away from the Pondicherry city centre and frequent bus services are available from Pondicherry for almost once in every 10–15 minutes. The population of the village is more than 10,000.. Around 5,000 people are registered as voters with the Election Commission of India.

The village has the history of over 1000 years and has blessed with a pleasant layout as you evidence from wikimapia. There are rivers on both sides of the village which help protect the village against cyclones. The village is surrounded by greenery due to fertile soil and good water supply.

Beach of the village 
The village has quite a lengthy and one of the most beautiful beaches in India which attracts tourist from local as well as abroad. A large number of people take sun bath and relax at the beach almost round the year. One can also enjoy seeing fishermen working with traditional fishing crafts and nets at dedicated sites.  Other scenes including fishing boats entering into the harbour can be seen while having fun at the beach.

Festivals in the village 

The village is famous for Car Festival celebrated here on the occasion of the six weeks long village temple (Sri Sengazhuneer Amman Temple) festival since the date immemorial. It attracts thousands of people from far and near. Veerampattinam is also famous for Masi Magam (gathering of several deities in front of beach) which is held in February/March of every year.

Profession of the villagers 
Most of the elderly citizens of the village are following fishing profession while youngsters of the village are working as professional experts/technicians across India and overseas. A good number of people are working as officers and engineers in merchant ships.

Schools in the village 
There are three government schools (Primary school, Jeevarathinam girls middle school and Singaravelar high school) in the village. Some of the children are taking the advantage of the village schools and others are going to private schools outside the village. The village has been developing fast lately particularly when 100% of the village children started going to school.

Gallery

References

External links 

 
 http://www.mssrf.org/tsunami/tidal_tragedy.htm
 http://www.india9.com/i9show/Veerampattinam-54156.htm
 http://police.pondicherry.gov.in/Ariankuppam%20PS.htm
 http://www.ceopuducherry.py.gov.in/index.html

Villages in Puducherry district
Ariyankuppam